The National Order of Madagascar is the highest of honorific orders of Madagascar.

History 
The National Order was created on 14 October 1958, the date on which the Malagasy Republic was proclaimed.

Classes 
The Order consists of the following classes of merit:

 Grand Cross
1st class
2nd class
 Grand Cordon
1st class
2nd class
 Grand Officer
 Commander
 Officer
 Knight

Recipients
 Al-Waleed bin Talal
 Alison Jolly
 Anne, Princess Royal
 Haile Selassie
 Konrad Adenauer
 Levi Eshkol
 Mohammed VI of Morocco
 Mufaddal Saifuddin
 Recep Tayyip Erdoğan
 Romain Bruno Légaré
 Kim Il-sung
 Albert Rakoto Ratsimamanga

References

Orders, decorations, and medals of Madagascar
Madagascar, National Order of
Awards established in 1958
1958 establishments in Madagascar